Tomáš Goder (born 4 September 1974) is a Czech former ski jumper who competed from 1991 to 1998. His career best achievement was winning a bronze medal in the team large hill competition at the 1992 Winter Olympics in Albertville, while his best individual success was bronze in the individual normal hill competition at the 1991 World Junior Championships.

External links
 
 

Czech male ski jumpers
Czechoslovak male ski jumpers
Ski jumpers at the 1992 Winter Olympics
Olympic bronze medalists for Czechoslovakia
Living people
1974 births
Olympic medalists in ski jumping
Olympic ski jumpers of Czechoslovakia
Medalists at the 1992 Winter Olympics
People from Jablonec nad Nisou District
Sportspeople from the Liberec Region